This is a list of women writers who were born in Croatia or whose writings are closely associated with that country.

A
Ivana Brlić-Mažuranić (1874–1938), children's writer

B
Jelica Belović-Bernardzikowska (1870–1946), feminist, pedagogic writer, ethnographer
Lukrecija Bogašinović Budmani (1710–1784), early poet
Anica Bošković (1714–1804), early poet and song writer

C
Nives Celsius (born 1981), columnist

D
Slavenka Drakulić (born 1949), novelist, essayist, and non-fiction writer
Daša Drndić (1946–2018), novelist

G
Stanka Gjurić (born 1956), poet and lyric essayist

I
Rada Iveković (born 1945), non-fiction writers
Nada Iveljić (1931–2009), children's writer

J
Marija Jambrišak (1847–1937), educator, writer, magazine editor 
Dragojla Jarnević (1813–1875), poet 
Marija Jurić Zagorka (1873–1957), journalist, novelist and dramatist

K
Lada Kaštelan (born 1961), dramatist, screenwriter
Nada Klaić (1920–1988), historian
Zlata Kolarić-Kišur (1894–1990), novelist, autobiographer
Vesna Krmpotić (1932–2018), novelist

M
Julijana Matanović (born 1959), short story writer and novelist

P
Vesna Parun (1922–2010), poet

Š
Sunčana Škrinjarić (1931–2004), writer, poet and journalist
Marina Šur Puhlovski, short story and travel writer, novelist and essayist

T
Jagoda Truhelka (1864–1957), novelist and pedagogist

U
Dubravka Ugrešić (1949–2023), novelist

Z
Katarina Zrinska (c. 1625–1673), noblewoman, poet
Cvijeta Zuzorić (1552–1648), lyric poet

See also
List of women writers
List of Croatian writers
Croatian literature

References

-
Croatian women writers, List of
Writers
Women writers, List of Croatian